There have been eleven presidential elections in France since the establishment of the Fifth Republic in 1958.

Originally the president was elected by the Collège des Notables (an assembly of "notable electors") that included around 80,000 county and city/town councillors (who had been elected locally).

Following constitutional reform in November 1962 (the constitutional Act of 6 November), pushed by President de Gaulle, the president has been directly elected by the people of France in a two-round election.

Until a 24 September 2000 constitutional referendum, the president had been elected for a seven-year term since 1974. With the referendum being successful, the term was reduced to five years. Therefore, once the winner of the 2002 election, Jacques Chirac, took office as president, the next election was scheduled for 2007 rather than 2009.

Currently, the President of the French Republic is elected to a five-year term in a two-round election under Article 7 of the Constitution: if no candidate secures an absolute majority (including blank and void ballots) of votes in the first round, a second round is held two weeks later between the two candidates who received the most votes. Since 1965, when the current (direct) election system was introduced, every election has gone to a second round.

The latest election was in 2022. The first round was held on 10 April 2022, the second on 24 April.

List of elections under the Fifth Republic
 1958 French presidential election: indirect suffrage (president elected by elected officials only): Charles de Gaulle elected
 1965 French presidential election: President de Gaulle defeats François Mitterrand in second round
 1969 French presidential election: Georges Pompidou defeats Alain Poher in second round
 1974 French presidential election: Valéry Giscard d'Estaing defeats François Mitterrand in second round
 1981 French presidential election: François Mitterrand defeats President Giscard d'Estaing in second round
 1988 French presidential election: President Mitterrand defeats Jacques Chirac in second round
 1995 French presidential election: Jacques Chirac defeats Lionel Jospin in second round
 2002 French presidential election: President Chirac defeats Jean-Marie Le Pen in second round
 2007 French presidential election: Nicolas Sarkozy defeats Ségolène Royal in second round
 2012 French presidential election: François Hollande defeats President Sarkozy in second round
 2017 French presidential election: Emmanuel Macron defeats Marine Le Pen in second round
 2022 French presidential election: President Macron defeats Marine Le Pen in the second round

Interesting facts 

 Four incumbent presidents —Charles de Gaulle (in 1965), François Mitterrand (in 1988), Jacques Chirac (in 2002) and Emmanuel Macron (in 2022)— were elected to second terms.
 Two incumbent presidents —Valéry Giscard d'Estaing (in 1981) and Nicolas Sarkozy (in 2012)— were defeated in the second round while seeking for re-election. Sarkozy aimed to be a candidate again in 2017, but was defeated in his party's primary. 
 Two Presidents —Mitterrand (in 1965 and 1974) and Chirac (in 1988)— had lost at least once in the second round before being elected. They are also the only candidates to have qualified for three or more second round runoffs (Mitterrand 4, Chirac 3). Giscard d'Estaing, Sarkozy, Macron and Marine Le Pen (all of them with 2) are the only other candidates to have been to the runoff twice or more.
 Only three Prime Ministers —de Gaulle, Georges Pompidou and Chirac— were subsequently elected president. Many others have tried and lost. 
 Only one parent-child pair have made it to the second round: Jean-Marie Le Pen in 2002 and his daughter Marine in 2017 and 2022.
 Only two women have reached the second round: Ségolène Royal in 2007 and Marine Le Pen in 2017 and 2022.
 Three winners of the first round lost in the second round: Mitterrand in 1974, Giscard d'Estaing in 1981 and Lionel Jospin in 1995.
 Mitterrand and Giscard d'Estaing (in 1974 and 1981), and Macron and Marine Le Pen (in 2017 and 2022), are the only candidates to have been confronted face-to-face in the second round runoff twice.
 The highest percentage of votes won in the second round was by Chirac in 2002 with 82.21%, followed by Macron in 2017 with 66.10%. 
 The 2017 second round was the first in which neither candidate represented a major parliamentary party.

References 

Presidential elections in France